In Greek mythology, Arethusa was a nymph who fled from her home in Arcadia beneath the sea and came up as a fresh water fountain on the island of Ortygia in Syracuse, Sicily.

Mythology 
The myth of her transformation begins in Arcadia when she came across a clear stream and began bathing, not knowing it was the river god Alpheus, who flowed down from Arcadia through Elis to the sea. He fell in love during their encounter, but she fled after discovering his presence and intentions, as she wished to remain a chaste attendant of Artemis. After a long chase, she prayed to her goddess to ask for protection. Artemis hid her in a cloud, but Alpheus was persistent. She began to perspire profusely from fear, and soon transformed into a stream.  Artemis then broke the ground allowing Arethusa another attempt to flee. Her stream traveled under the sea to the island of Ortygia, but Alpheus flowed through the sea to reach her and mingle with her waters. Virgil augurs for Arethusa a salt-free passage beneath the sea on the condition that, before departing, she grant him songs about troubled loves, not those in her own future, but those of Virgil's friend and contemporary, the poet Cornelius Gallus, whom Virgil imagines dying from unrequited love beneath the famous mountains of Arcadia, Maenalus and Lycaeus. During Demeter's search for her daughter Persephone, Arethusa entreated Demeter to discontinue her punishment of Sicily for her daughter's disappearance. She told the goddess that while traveling in her stream below the earth, she saw her daughter as the queen of Hades.

The Roman writer Ovid called Arethusa by the name "Alpheias", because her stream was believed to have a subterranean communication with the river Alpheius, in Peloponnesus. A legend of the period, still told in Sicily today, is that a wooden cup tossed into the River Alpheius will reappear in the Fountain of Arethusa in Syracuse.

Apart from retellings by classical authors including Ovid and Virgil, Percy Bysshe Shelley wrote a poem on Arethusa in 1820. Anne Ridler's "Evenlode" (1959), which she described as "a fable of rivers designed for broadcasting with music," has Alpheus and Arethusa as its main characters.

Coin of Arethusa 
As a patron figure of Syracuse, the head of Arethusa surrounded by dolphins was a usual type on their coins.  They are regarded as among the most famous and beautiful Ancient Greek coins.

In music 
Karol Szymanowski, Polish classical music composer, named "The Fountain of Arethusa" first of his three poems entitled "Myths" for violin and piano.
The Saucy Arethusa is an 18th-century song about a British naval ship named after Arethusa. A song on the album Her Majesty the Decemberists by The Decemberists called "Shanty for the Arethusa" is about a different ship called Arethusa. A movement of Benjamin Britten's oboe piece Six Metamorphoses After Ovid is entitled "Arethusa." Italian composer Ottorino Respighi composed a tone poem titled "Aretusa". 

Also Ralph Vaughan Williams, the English classical music composer, composed "Sea Songs", a quick march for both brass band and wind band written in 1923, used a Morris Dance tune 'The Royal Princess' which was also known by the title 'The Arethusa', alongside two other shanty tunes 'Admiral Benbow' and 'Portsmouth'.

'The Princess Royal' is one of the most celebrated of Turlough O'Carolan's compositions, largely because of its association with the words of the song 'The Aretusa', to which it was set by Shield toward the end of the eighteenth century. The song of 'The Aretusa' originally appeared in a small opera or musical entertainment called 'The Lock and Key', which was acted in 1796. The Princess Royal was composed for the eldest daughter in Carolan's time of The MacDermott Roe of Coolavin. (There is also an English folk tune, of fairly wide distribution in England, which is entitled 'The Princess Royal' but has no connection with Carolan's melody.)

Gallery

Arethusa and Alpheus

Arethusa and Demeter

Classical Literature Sources 
Arethusa

Chronological listing of classical literature sources for Arethousa, Aerika, Arethusam, Arethiisae, Arethusii or Arethusa:

 Homer, Odyssey 13. 404 ff (trans. Palmer) (Greek epic poetry C8th BC)
 Euripides, Iphigenia in Aulis 164 ff (trans. Coleridge) (Greek tragedy C5th BC)
 Pindar, Isthmian Ode 3. 69 ff (trans. Sandys) (Greek lyric C5th BC)
 Scholiast on Pindar, The Nemean Odes 1. 1 (The Odes of Pindar trans. Sandys 1915 p. 317)
 Theocritus, Idyll 1. 117 ff (trans. Banks) (Greek poetry C3rd BC)
 Theocritus, Idyll 16. 103 ff
 Theocritus, Idyll 22. 40 ff
 Scholiast on Theocritus, Idyll 22. 40 (The Idylls Of Theocritus trans. Cholmeley 1919 p. 337)
 Moschus, Idyll 3. 9 ff (trans. Banks) (Greek poetry C2nd BC)
 Moschus, Idyll 3. 74 ff
 Moschus, Idyll 7. 1 ff
 Scholiast on Moschus, Idyll 7. 1 ff (The Idylls of Theocritus, Bion, and Moschus Banks 1853 p. 200)
 Horace, Ode 3. 13. 13 (trans. Bennett) (Roman lyric poetry C1st BC)
 Scholiast on Horace, Ode 3. 13. 13 (Horace Odes and Erodes trans. Bennett 1901 p. 336)
 Propertius, Elegies 4. 3. 1 ff (trans. Butler) (Latin poetry C1st BC)
 Ibycus, Fragment 24 (trans. Edmonds, Lyra Graeca Vol 2 p. 97) (Greek commentary C1st BC)
 Diodorus Siculus, Library of History 5. 3. 5 ff (trans. Oldfather) (Greek history C1st BC)
 Diodorus Siculus, Library of History 16. 18. 3 ff
 Scholiast on Diodorus Siculus, Library of History Fragments of Books 34 and 35. 9 ff (Diodorus of Sicily trans. Oldfather 1967 Vol 12 p. 97)
 Cicero, Against Verres 5. 53 (trans. Middleton, Melmoth and Heberden) (Roman philosophy C1st BC)
 Cicero, Against Verres 6. 31 (trans. Middleton, Melmoth & Heberden)
 Virgil, Eclogue 10. 1 ff (trans. Hamilton Bryce) (Roman poetry C1st BC)
 Virgil, Georgics 4. 322 ff (trans. Hamilton Bryce)
 Virgil, Georgics 4. 343 ff (trans. Fairclough)
 Virgil, The Aeneid 3. 694 ff
 Ovid, Fasti 4. 423 ff (trans. Frazer) (Roman epic poetry C1st BC to C1st AD)
 Scholiast on Ovid, Fasti 4. 423 (Ovid's Fasti trans. Frazer 1959 1931 p. 220)
 Ovid, Metamorphoses 5. 409 ff (trans. Miller) (Roman epic poetry C1st BC To C1st AD)
 Ovid, Metamorphoses 5. 486-646
 Ovid, The Amores 3. 6. 28 ff (trans. Showerman) (Roman poetry C1st BC to C1st AD)
 Scholiast on Ovid, The Amores 3. 6. 28 ff (Ovid Heroides and Amores trans. Showerman 1914 p. 469)
 Livy, The History of Rome 25. 30. 6 ff (trans. Moore) (Roman history C1st BC to C1st AD)
 Strabo, Geography 1. 3. 16 (trans. Jones) (Greek geography C1st BC to C1st AD)
 Strabo, Geography 6. 2. 4
 Strabo, Geography 10. 1. 13
 Strabo, Geography 16. 2. 10
 Strabo, Geography 16. 2. 11
 Lucan, Pharsalia 3. 177 (trans. Riley) (Roman poetry C1st AD)
 Scholiast on Lucan, Pharsalia 3. 177 (The Pharsalia of Lucan trans. Riley 1853 p. 98)
 Lucan, Pharsalia 9. 358 ff
 Scholiast on Lucan, The Pharsalia of Lucan 9. 362 (The Pharsalia of Lucan trans. Riley 1853 p. 353)
 Silius, Punica 5. 490 ff (trans. Duff) (Roman epic poetry C1st AD)
 Silius, Punica 14. 53 ff
 Silius, Punica 14. 117 ff
 Silius, Punica 14. 295 ff
 Silius, Punica 14. 515 ff
 Statius, Silvae 1. 2. 203 ff (trans. Mozley) (Roman epic poetry C1st AD)
 Scholiast on Statius, Silvae 1. 2. 203 ff (Statius trans. Mozley 1928 Vol 1 p. 31)
 Pliny, Natural History 2. 106 (103) ff (trans. Bostock & Riley) (Roman history C1st AD)
 Scholiast on Pliny, Natural History 2. 106 (103) ff (The Natural History of Pliny trans. Bostock & Riley 1855 Vol 1 p. 131)
 Pliny, Natural History 3. 14 (8) ff
 Pliny, Natural History 4. 12 ff
 Pliny, Natural History 4. 17 ff
 Scholiast on Pliny, Natural History 4. 17 ff  (The Natural History of Pliny trans. Bostock & Riley 1855 Vol 1 p. 299)
 Pliny, Natural History 5. 19 (23) ff
 Scholiast on Pliny, Natural History 5. 19 (23) ff (The Natural History of Pliny trans. Bostock & Riley 1855 Vol 1 p. 440)
 Pliny, Natural History 6. 30 ff
 Scholiast on Pliny, Natural History 6. 30 ff (The Natural History of Pliny trans. Bostock & Riley 1855 Vol 2 p. 75)
 Pliny, Natural History 31. 30 ff
 Scholiast on Pliny, Natural History 31. 30 ff (The Natural History of Pliny trans. Bostock & Riley 1855 Vol 5 p. 493):
 Plutarch, Lives Lycurgus 31. 3 ff
 Plutarch, Lives Antony 37. 1 ff
 Plutarch, Moralia, That a Philosopher Ought to Converse Especially with Men in Power 776 E ff (trans. Babbitt)
 Plutarch, Moralia, Whether Land or Sea Animals are Cleverer 976 ff (trans. Cherniss & Helmbold)
 Plutarch, Moralia, Fragment 81. 181 ff (Sandbach)
 Pseudo-Apollodorus, The Library 2. 5. 11 ff (trans. Frazer) (Greek mythography C2nd AD)
 Pausanias, Description of Greece 5. 7. 2 ff (trans. Jones) (Greek travelogue C2nd AD)
 Pausanias, Description of Greece 7. 23. 2 ff
 Pausanias, Description of Greece 7. 24. 3 ff
 Pausanias, Description of Greece 8. 54. 2 ff
 Aelian, On Animals 8. 4 (trans. Scholfield) (Greek natural history C2nd AD)
 Lucian, Dialogues of the Sea-Gods 296 ff (trans. Harmon) (Assyrian satire C2nd AD)
 Appian, The Syrian Wars 57 (trans. White) (Greek history C2nd AD)
 Scholiast on Appian, The Syrian Wars 57 (Appian's Roman History trans. White 1913 Vol 4 p. 629)
 Pseudo-Hyginus, Fabulae Preface (trans. Grant) (Roman mythography C2nd AD)
 Pseudo-Hyginus, Fabulae 157
 Pseudo-Hyginus, Fabulae 181
 Achilles Tatius, 1. 18 ff (trans. Gaselee) (C2nd AD Greek romance)
 Apuleius, Psyche Canto 5 (trans. Tighe in The Works of Apuleius trans. Hudson 1914) (Latin poetry C2nd AD)
 Athenaeus, Banquet of the Learned 2. 16 (trans. Yonge) (Greek rhetoric C2nd AD to C3rd AD)
 Athenaeus, Banquet of the Learned 8. 3
 Philostratus the Elder, Imagines 2. 6 ff (trans. Fairbanks) (Greek rhetoric C3rd AD)
 Scholiast on Philostratus the Elder, Imagines 2. 6 ff (Philostratus Imagines Callisteatus Descriptions Fairbanks 1931 p. 150)
 Ammianus Marcellinus, Ammianus Marcellinus 15. 4. 6 ff (trans. Rolfe) (Roman history C4th AD)
 Quintus Smyrnaeus, Fall of Troy 10. 82 ff (trans. Way) (Greek epic poetry C4th AD)
 Servius, Servii Grammatici In Vergilii Aeneidos 3. 694 (trans. Thilo & Hagen) (Greek commentary C4th AD to 5th AD)
 Scholiast on Servii Grammatici In Vergilii Aeneidos 3. 694 (Servii Grammatici In Vergilii trans. Thilo & Hagen 1881 Vol 1 p. 455)
 Servius, Servii Grammatici In Vergilii Aeneidos 3. 697
 Servius, Servii Grammatici In Vergilii Aeneidos 4. 484
 Servius, Servii Grammatici In Vergilii Aeneidos 8. 40
 Nonnos, Dionysiaca 37. 171 ff (trans. Rouse) (Greek epic poetry C5th AD):
 Nonnos, Dionysiaca 40. 560 ff
 Nonnos, Dionysiaca 45. 117 ff
 Martianus Capella, Martianus Capella, Liber 6 De Geometria 658. 12 ff (ed. Eyssenhardt) (Roman prose C5th AD)
 Procopius, History of the Wars 3. 14. 11 ff (Greco-Byzantinian history C6th AD)
 First Vatican Mythographer, Scriptores rerum mythicarum 166 Arethuisa et Alpheus (ed. Bode) (Greco-Roman mythography C9th AD to C11th AD)
 Second Vatican Mythographer, Scriptores rerum mythicarum 93 Venus (ed. Bode) (Greco-Roman mythography C11th AD)
 Second Vatican Mythographer, Scriptores rerum mythicarum 173 Arethusa)
 Tzetzes, Chiliades or Book of Histories 9. 491 ff (trans. Untila et al.) (Greco-Byzantinian history C12 AD)
 Tzetzes, Chiliades or Book of Histories 9. 882 ff
 Tzetzes, Chiliades or Book of Histories 10. 385 ff

See also
 Fountain of Arethusa
 Ortygia Island 
 Syracuse, Sicily
 95 Arethusa

References

External links 

 
 Warburg Institute Iconographic Database (ca 40 images of Arethusa) 

Nereids
Metamorphoses into bodies of water in Greek mythology
Metamorphoses characters
Deeds of Artemis
Rape of Persephone